Fahrenheit is the codename for a GPU microarchitecture developed by Nvidia, and released in 1998, as the successor to STG-2000, Riva 128 (NV1, NV2, NV3...) microarchitecture. It was named with reference to Fahrenheit and used with STG-2000, Riva 128.

Graphics features 

 DirectX 5.0 and 6.0
 OpenGL 1.2
Vertex shader: None
Pixel shader: ?
Z-buffer 24 bits
Up to 2048*2048 pixels texture size
32-bit (truecolor) pixel format (add since Riva TNT)
AGP 4X support
Bump Mapping in single cycle
Up to 32MB video memory

GPU list

See also 

 List of Nvidia graphics processing units
 Scalable Link Interface (SLI)
 Qualcomm Adreno
 Celsius (microarchitecture)

References 

GPGPU
Nvidia Fahrenheit
Nvidia microarchitectures
Parallel computing
Graphics cards